Nace Majcen (born 12 July 1968 in Ljubljana) is a retired male freestyle swimmer from Slovenia. He represented his native country at the 1992 Summer Olympics in Barcelona, Spain, competing in two individual events (200m and 400m freestyle). He later started a career in marathon swimming, competing for instance at the 1998 World Aquatics Championships.

He ended the career in 2002 and became a coach. His brother Igor also was a swimmer.

References

sports-reference

1968 births
Living people
Slovenian male freestyle swimmers
Olympic swimmers of Slovenia
Swimmers at the 1992 Summer Olympics
Sportspeople from Ljubljana

Mediterranean Games bronze medalists for Yugoslavia
Swimmers at the 1987 Mediterranean Games
Mediterranean Games medalists in swimming
20th-century Slovenian people
21st-century Slovenian people